Pseudotorellia fragilis is a species of small sea snail with a transparent, more or less internal shell, a marine gastropod mollusk in the family Velutinidae. Because the shell is mostly internal, the snail resembles a sea slug in general appearance.

Description

Distribution

References

Velutinidae
Gastropods described in 1989